The Kingdom of Tonga has been a member of the Commonwealth of Nations since 1970. It has taken part in ten editions of the Commonwealth Games to date, beginning in 1974. Tonga's participation is under the responsibility of the Tonga Sports Association and National Olympic Committee  (TASANOC).

Medal tally
Prior to the 2010 Commonwealth Games in Delhi, Tonga ranked joint fifty-fourth on the all-time medal tally of the Commonwealth Games having won a single medal when Paea Wolfgram took bronze in the Men's Super Heavyweight in boxing at the 1994 Games.

During the Delhi Games that tally has increased to three medals after Lomalito Moala and Junior Fa each secured a bronze medal in the Men's Lightweight and Men's Super Heavyweight boxing events respectively.

See also

All-time medal tally of Commonwealth Games

References

External links
TASANOC
Commonwealth Games Federation

 
Tonga and the Commonwealth of Nations
Nations at the Commonwealth Games